Loxa flavicollis is a species of stink bug in the family Pentatomidae. It is found in the Caribbean and North America.

References

Further reading

 
 
 

Insects described in 1773
Pentatomini
Taxa named by Dru Drury